The DR Class 119 was an East German Deutsche Reichsbahn diesel locomotive that was built in Romania. When the Deutsche Bahn AG formed up in 1993 it was redesignated as DBAG Class 219.

They were nicknamed "U-boats", "Karpatenschreck" ("Carpathian Terror") or "Ceaușescus Rache" ("Ceaușescu's revenge") - the latter two referring to the numerous technical problems the engines suffered before redesign.

History 
The Class 119 was basically a development of the successful Class 118. In the late 1970s the DR needed locomotives with electric train heating, an axle load (Achsfahrmasse) of under 16 t and a power output of over 2,000 horsepower. As a result of the Comecon agreements, the East German economy was not allowed to build diesel locomotives with more than 1,500 horsepower. The locomotive builders of the Soviet Union could only supply heavy engines - the Classes 130-132 and 142. The only engine builder, who also wanted to use the "construction kit" (Baukasten) principle was the "23rd August" Locomotive Works, Bucharest, in Romania. The Romanian manufacturer declared itself also ready to install diesel engines produced in East Germany. The installation of such engines did not happen, however, because there were coordination problems in East Germany's national planning commission. In order the fulfil the order, the Bucharest factory installed engines under licence from the West German manufacturer, MTU.

Other countries in Comecon also received subcontractor orders. East Germany itself supplied inter alia hydrodynamic transmissions and axle motors. 

The DR procured 200 locomotives from 1976 to 1985. The locomotive drive was, however, plagued by shortcomings and problems from the start. In its early days, 50% of the locomotives were in the workshops at any one time.

Literature

External links 
 
 The Class 219/229 in numbers, facts and pictures
 The BR 119 of the Deutsche Reichsbahn
 Bahn-Galerie.de - Classes 219 and 229 
 DR Class 119 from Romania

Railway locomotives introduced in 1976
Diesel locomotives of Germany
119
DR 119
FAUR locomotives
Standard gauge locomotives of Germany